Peter Keller (born 19 October 1944 in Ballarat, Victoria) is a former Australian professional tennis player. He reached the first with J. Thomson and second round with John Newcombe at the 1962 Australian Championships in the men's singles and again in 1965 with Juan Gisbert Sr. He was currently ranked as Australian number two in the 1970s. He became active between early to late 1960s.

Keller was still competing at age 73, finishing second to Camina Borda in the Super-Senior World Individual Championships 70s in 2017 despite having undergone quintuple bypass heart surgery earlier that year.

References

External links 
 

1944 births
Living people
Australian male tennis players
Sportspeople from Ballarat
Tennis people from Victoria (Australia)
20th-century Australian people